Palmer Ranch is a census-designated place and planned community in Sarasota County, Florida between the cities of Sarasota and Osprey. The area was part of the original  of Florida land purchased by Bertha Palmer, wife of Chicago businessman Potter Palmer.

History

Bertha Palmer, known as Mrs. Potter Palmer, came to Sarasota in 1910, and resided on Little Sarasota Bay for her winter home. She improved agricultural methods to the land, added lavish gardens, and buildings which the land is now the Historic Spanish Point garden and historic site. While the house The Oaks is gone, outbuildings and landscape remain, including remnants of designs by Achilles Duchene, after whom the Duchene Garden is named. Other former Palmer family holdings now open to the public include the Myakka River State Park and an expansion of Oscar Scherer State Park. After her death, Bertha Palmer gave the land to her sons Potter Jr. and Honore, who continued developing the property as a ranch.

Hugh Culverhouse, founder of the Tampa Bay Buccaneers, bought  of the remaining land in 1972. Palmer Ranch was established in December 1984 as a Development of Regional Impact (DRI) under Section 380.06 of the Florida Statutes.

References

External links
 Bertha Palmer in Sarasota History
 NYTimes Myakka Park travel story
 Timeline of Myakka River from Sarasota Herald-Tribune

Sarasota, Florida
Planned communities in Florida
Census-designated places in Sarasota County, Florida